Julio Peralta and Horacio Zeballos were the defending champions, but Peralta chose not to participate this year. Zeballos played alongside Federico Delbonis, but lost to Sander Gillé and Joran Vliegen in the final, 7–6(7–5), 5–7, [5–10].

Seeds

Draw

Draw

External Links
 Main Draw

Swedish Open - Doubles
2019 Doubles